Gorrell Robert Stinson III (born October 11, 1945) is a former switch-hitting catcher in Major League Baseball from -. Stinson played for six major league franchises, most notably the Seattle Mariners.

Career
Stinson was selected in the Major League Baseball Draft by both the Kansas City Athletics and Washington Senators while at Miami High School but did not sign with either club. He was then taken by the Los Angeles Dodgers on June 7, 1966, as the 15th overall selection in the secondary phase of the draft while attending Miami-Dade Community College.

Stinson broke into the Majors on September 23, 1969 with the Dodgers, at the age of 23. Then on October 5, 1970, Stinson was traded along with Ted Sizemore to the St. Louis Cardinals for Dick Allen. He appeared in 17 games in 1971 for the Cardinals.

Finding a role as a journeyman, Stinson moved on to the Houston Astros, spending the  season in that organization. He then played two seasons each with the Montreal Expos and Kansas City Royals.

Stinson had been a backup for his Major League career prior to joining the Mariners.

Stinson logged his best overall season in 1978, establishing career highs in games played, at-bats, hits, doubles, home runs, and RBI. In 124 games for Seattle that season, he batted .258 with 11 homers and drove in 55 runs. He also had a .346 on-base percentage and a slugging average of .404.

Yet with the March  acquisition of Larry Cox from the Chicago Cubs, Stinson's playing time slowly began to dwindle. That season, Stinson caught in 91 games to Cox's 99. By , Cox was the Mariners' regular catcher, with Stinson the backup before eventually losing the backup job to 24-year-old Jerry Narron, future Major League manager and coach. Stinson's final game in a big league uniform was August 1, 1980, after over three and a half seasons with the Mariners. He was released by Seattle seven days later.

In 652 major league games, Stinson had 408 hits in 1634 at-bats for a .250 batting average, with 33 home runs and 180 RBI.

External links

Baseball Gauge
Venezuelan Professional Baseball League

1945 births
Living people
Albuquerque Dodgers players
American expatriate baseball players in Canada
Arizona Instructional League Dodgers players
Baseball players from North Carolina
Houston Astros players
Kansas City Royals players
Leones del Caracas players
American expatriate baseball players in Venezuela
Los Angeles Dodgers players
Major League Baseball catchers
Miami Dade Sharks baseball players
Montreal Expos players
Ogden Dodgers players
People from Elkin, North Carolina
St. Louis Cardinals players
Santa Barbara Dodgers players
Seattle Mariners players
Spokane Indians players
Tigres de Aragua players
Tulsa Oilers (baseball) players
Miami Senior High School alumni